Euphoria Tour may refer to:

 Euphoria Tour (Def Leppard), 1999–2001
 Euphoria Tour (Enrique Iglesias), 2011–2012
 Euphoria Tour (Usher), 2013 (cancelled)